Oelsnitz is a town in the district Erzgebirgskreis, in Saxony, Germany. It is situated 14 km east of Zwickau, and 20 km southwest of Chemnitz. Between 1844 and 1971 hardcoal was mined in Oelsnitz and the surrounding towns. The major mine "Karl-Liebknecht" became a mining museum in 1986.

Twin towns — sister cities
Oelsnitz is twinned with:

  Avion, France (1961)
  Mimoň, Czech Republic (1968)
  Sprockhövel, Germany (2000)
  Chodov, Czech Republic (2004)

References 

Erzgebirgskreis